Doornsteeg is a neighbourhood of Nijkerk and a hamlet in the Dutch province of Gelderland. It is a part of the municipality of Nijkerk, and lies about 8 km northeast of Amersfoort.

It was first mentioned in 1556 as Dorenstege, and means "thorny path". The hamlet consists of about 25 houses. Since 2016, Nijkerk has started to built a new neighbourhood near the hamlet.

References
 

Populated places in Gelderland
Nijkerk